Pollock Mountain is located in the Lewis Range, Glacier National Park in the U.S. state of Montana. The mountain was named by Ross Carter for William C. Pollock, a member of the Indian Commission who along with Walter M. Clements and George Bird Grinnell negotiated with the Blackfeet to consummate the treaty that enabled the Federal Government to purchase the "Ceded Strip" of land, which included all of what is now Glacier National Park to the east of the Continental Divide.

Geology

Like other mountains in Glacier National Park, the peak is composed of sedimentary rock laid down during the Precambrian to Jurassic periods.

Climate
Based on the Köppen climate classification, the peak is located in an alpine subarctic climate zone with long, cold, snowy winters, and cool to warm summers. Temperatures can drop below −10 °F with wind chill factors below −30 °F.

See also
 Mountains and mountain ranges of Glacier National Park (U.S.)

References

Mountains of Flathead County, Montana
Mountains of Glacier County, Montana
Pollock
Lewis Range
Mountains of Montana